Stachyamoeba is a genus the amoeboid Heterolobosea.

References

Percolozoa
Excavata genera